is a Japanese journalist and host who is represented by the talent agency North Production. He presided in the news site 8bitNews. He is a former NHK announcer.

Filmography (during NHK)
Okayama

Tokyo announcer

Filmography (after NHK)

TV series

Radio series

Internet series

References

External links
 Official profile 

Japanese television journalists
1977 births
Living people
People from Hyōgo Prefecture
Rikkyo University alumni